Robert Bruce Burnside (22 April 1862 – 8 August 1929) was an Australian barrister and judge. He served on the Supreme Court of Western Australia from December 1902 until his death.

Burnside was born in Nassau, Bahamas, to Mary Elizabeth (née Francis) and Robert Bruce Lockhart Burnside. His father was the colony's solicitor-general at the time, and later served as Chief Justice of Ceylon. After attending the Royal Naval School in London, Burnside studied law, training as a barrister. He entered Lincoln's Inn in 1881 and was called to the bar in 1884, leaving for Western Australia later that year. He initially had his own firm in Perth, but later went into partnership with Douglas Gawler (a future member of parliament) in Fremantle. In January 1891, Burnside was appointed to the position of Usher of the Black Rod in the Legislative Council. He served until July 1894, when he was instead made crown solicitor (equivalent to solicitor-general).

In December 1902, Burnside was appointed to the vacant fourth position on the Supreme Court, as a puisne justice. He succeeded Frederick Moorhead, who had died after only seven months in office, and joined Edward Stone (the chief justice), Stephen Henry Parker, and Robert McMillan on the bench. Early in 1903, Burnside was made president of the State Court of Arbitration, a position which at the time was held only by justices of the Supreme Court. He served several terms in the position, totalling almost ten years, and was generally considered impartial. Burnside also occasionally presided over criminal trials, and headed two royal commissions in the late 1910s. Burnside died at his home in Claremont in August 1929, after a brief period of ill health. He had married Mary Charity Bruce in 1887, with whom he had one son. Outside of his professional career, he had a keen interest in water sport, serving as president of the West Australian Rowing Club and commodore of the Royal Perth Yacht Club.

References

1862 births
1929 deaths
Australian barristers
Bahamian emigrants to Australia
English barristers
Judges of the Supreme Court of Western Australia
People educated at the Royal Naval School
People from Nassau, Bahamas
Public servants of Western Australia
Members of Lincoln's Inn